Josh or Joshua Holmes may refer to:

 Josh Holmes (rugby union) (born 1987), Australian rugby union player
 Josh Holmes (video game designer) (born 1973), Canadian game producer and video game designer